Black Alliance for Peace (also referred to as BAP) is a people(s)-centered human rights project against war, repression, and imperialism. The Open Collective is the fiscal sponsor of the formation.

The mission of the organization is "to recapture and redevelop the historic anti-war, anti-imperialist, and pro-peace positions of the radical black movement."

History
Founded in April 2017 by Ajamu Baraka, the Black Alliance for Peace is part of the renewed effort to organize the anti-war movement based within the Black community in the United States. The organization's founding members agreed to ten points of unity: the right to self defense; self determination; anti-imperialism; working-class foundation; intersectionality; anti-patriarchy; decolonization; prisoner support; black unity; and southern roots.

Coordinating Committee
The Coordinating Committee of the Black Alliance for Peace currently consists of sixteen representatives of BAP internal structures and member organizations.

Current members:
 Ajamu Baraka, Coordinating Committee Chairperson and former National Organizer
 Erica Caines, BAP-Baltimore and Coordinating Committee Vice-Chair
 Margaret Kimberley, BAP Africa Team and Coordinating Committee Treasurer 
 Austin Cole, BAP Haiti/Americas Team and Coordinating Committee Secretary
 Dedan Waciuri, Black Workers for Justice
 Jacqueline Luqman, BAP-DC
 Jaribu Hill, Mississippi Workers Center for Human Rights
 Jemima Pierre, BAP Haiti/Americas Team
 Julie Varughese, BAP Solidarity Network
 Matt Almonte, BAP Solidarity Network
Netfa Freeman, Pan-African Community Action (PACA)
Nnamdi Lumumba, Ujima People’s Progress Party
Noah Tesfaye, BAP Research and Political Education Team
Paul Pumphrey, Friends of the Congo
Rafiki Morris, All-African People’s Revolutionary Party (A-APRP)
Tunde Osazua, BAP Outreach Team

Objectives
The organization is simultaneously campaigning on nearly a dozen various issues, with a focus on peace, people-centered human rights, and anti-imperialism education.

Domestically, BAP opposes Israeli training of American police forces and the Department of Defense's 1033 program that allows military grade equipment to transfer into the possession of civilian police departments. In addition to calling for accountability for police brutality and the elimination of Operation Relentless Pursuit, the organization is calling for a 50% reduction in the U.S. military budget to finance the human-rights needs of the American public. The organization is calling on the U.S. Congress to pass legislation in support of the abolition of nuclear weapons.

On foreign affairs, BAP's primary campaign is its demand to shut down the U.S. Africa Command (AFRICOM) and end all U.S. intervention on the continent of Africa. This is reinforced by BAP's other aims to abolish NATO, close the 800+ U.S. foreign military bases, end all foreign interventions and illegal sanctions, and to uphold global norms by complying with international law.

See also
 Anti-war movement
 List of anti-war organizations
 Black Panther Party
 Racism in the United States

References

Black Lives Matter
21st-century social movements
2017 establishments in the United States
African Americans' rights organizations
Anti-black racism in the United States
Anti-racism
Civil rights protests in the United States
Criminal justice reform in the United States
Criticism of police brutality
History of African-American civil rights
Organizations established in 2017
Post–civil rights era in African-American history
Race and crime in the United States
Social justice organizations
Black Power
Civil disobedience
Direct action
Left-wing politics
Peace organizations based in the United States